Rainer Torres Salas (born 12 January 1980) is a Peruvian football manager and former player who most recently managed Serrato Pacasmayo.

Career 
Torres began in Academia Cantolao and Sport Boys. He moved to Europe to play for the German club MSV Duisburg and Austrian club DSV Leoben. He returned to Peru to play for Universitario. Problems between Torres and the directors of the club caused him to sign with Sporting Cristal where would played for four seasons and win one national championship. He returned to Universitario in 2008 but was unable to play in the first seven games of the season because of an injury in preseason.

Torres made 28 appearances for the Peru national team.

In August 2016, he announced his retirement from football.

Honors
Sporting Cristal
 Torneo Descentralizado: 2005

Universitario de Deportes
 Torneo Descentralizado: 2009, 2013

FBC Melgar
 Torneo Descentralizado: 2015

References

External links

1980 births
Living people
Sportspeople from Callao
Peruvian footballers
Association football midfielders
Peru international footballers
Peruvian Primera División players
2. Bundesliga players
MSV Duisburg players
DSV Leoben players
Club Universitario de Deportes footballers
Sporting Cristal footballers
FBC Melgar footballers
Peruvian expatriate sportspeople in Germany
Peruvian expatriate footballers
Expatriate footballers in Germany
Peruvian expatriate sportspeople in Austria
Expatriate footballers in Austria
Sport Rosario managers